John Wilberforce "Jocko" Anderson (October 4, 1893 – July 22, 1960) was a Canadian two-sport athlete from Canada. In Winnipeg, he won the 1915 Connaught Cup with Winnipeg Scottish FC in soccer and the 1916 Allan Cup with the Winnipeg 61st Battalion in ice hockey. As a professional hockey player, he won the 1925 Stanley Cup with the Victoria Cougars.

Anderson played in the Western Canada Hockey League with the Calgary Tigers and in the Pacific Coast Hockey Association with the Victoria Cougars. In soccer, he also played for the Calgary Callies.

Accomplishments
Allan Cup – 1916 (Winnipeg 61st Battalion)
Stanley Cup – 1925 (Victoria Cougars)

References

External links

1893 births
1960 deaths
Calgary Tigers players
Canadian ice hockey centres
Ice hockey people from Manitoba
Stanley Cup champions
Victoria Cougars (1911–1926) players
Canadian soccer players
Soccer people from Manitoba
Association footballers not categorized by position